Crystal Palace was a basketball team competing in the National Basketball League (NBL) and then the British Basketball League (BBL), until they merged with the London Towers in 1998. They played in the Crystal Palace Sports Centre and were the most successful team in Britain throughout the seventies and early eighties.

History
In 1966 the Old Suttonians basketball club was founded by several ex pupils of Sutton Grammar School including David Last and Terry Doherty who both performed the role of director of the club in future years. In 1972 the club entered the new National League as Sutton basketball club and finished third of six teams. the following season they relocated to Crystal Palace and became the Sutton & Crystal Palace club. Success arrived quickly with a league and cup double the very next season.

In 1975 the club dropped the Sutton prefix and gained sponsorship from Cinzano which helped propel them into being the best club in Britain. The team would go on to complete three consecutive doubles of National League and National Cup. The team became regarded as the pioneers of UK basketball and their early players included Jim Guymon, Martin Hall, Barry Huxley, Mark Saiers, Alan Baillie, Pete Jeremich and Paul Philp. An incredible treble ensued in the 79–80 season and other players to represent the club included players such as Dan Lloyd, Bob Roma, Paul Stimpson, Mick Bett and Alton Byrd, the latter considered the man who revolutionised basketball in Britain.
Further success followed and it was not until the advent of Channel 4 TV coverage and big spending football club takeovers that Palace lost their mantle as top club. In September 1986 Crystal Palace and Brunel Uxbridge & Camden Ducks joined forces with fixtures being split between the Crystal Palace Sports Centre and Brunel University. Immediate glory returned to the club when after finishing fourth in the league they went on to win the 1987 play Off's but after just one season the club ran into financial difficulty and were forced to sell many players and change their name back to just Crystal Palace. Players from the highly successful junior programme led by Roy Packham and Mark Dunning made up the team along with a number of talented juniors from Kevin Hibb's Kingston Junior programme. Graham Hill, Derek Johnson, Brian Moore, Roger Hosannah, Derek Lewis, Paul Smith, Michael Hosannah and Adrian Cummings were notable juniors that made the transition to the senior team which was led by Daryl Reshaw and Shaughan Ryan. 

Following the completion of the 1988 season the club dropped out of the Carlsberg League into the National League before failing to compete for the first time in the 1990/91 season. A return to action came the following season when Crystal Palace lined up in the third division of the revamped Carlsberg League finishing runners up to another former basketball giant the Solent Stars.The returning Tim Lewis led the home grown talent along with Junior Peters Clinton ford, Brian Moore, Tunde Orelaja, Roger Lloyd and Adrian Jones. This team gain promotion two years running. 
  

The 1993–1994 season saw Budweiser sponsor tier 1 of the league which as a consequence meant the National League was restructured moving Palace into division one where they finished Runner-up to Coventry Crusaders. The following season Alton Byrd returned to the club as player/general manager kick starting a successful season as they won Division One. The league win was repeated the following year because Palace had remained in the National League after their application to join the Budweiser League (tier 1) was rejected.  The team continued the development of British talent. Richard Scantlebury, Neill Rickets, Andy Powlesland, Graham Hill, Adrian Cummings, Ade Orelaja and Time Lewis all becoming permanent fixtures in the team.

In 1996 a return to the top tier in for the first time since 1988 ensued. Transition back to the BBL was difficult, other talented British players such as, Barry Gooch, Jason Crump, Clive Lindo, Jimmy Markham joined the club along with Junior Williams and Wayne Henry. A lack of sponsorship and the retirement of Alton Byrd had a major impact on the club. The Club tried to hang on to its ethos of growing local talent, Graham Hill a former junior and senior player was given the coaches job but after two mediocre seasons and despite the best efforts of club stalwarts Roy Packham and Terry Doherty the club merged with London Towers and the name Crystal Palace (the most successful UK basketball club in history at the time) ceased to exist.

Record in European competition

Season-by-season records

Notable players

  Alton Byrd
 Mark Saiers
 Alan Baillie
 Paul Stimpson
 Dan Lloyd
 Pete Jeremich
 Mick Bett 
 Jim Guymon
 Bob Roma
 Paul Philp
 Barry Huxley (Capt.)
 Richard Scantlebury
 Neill Rickets
 Tim Lewis
 Graham Hill
 Andrew Powlesland
 Adrian Cummings
 John Johnson
 Tom Seaman
 Bubba Jennings
 Joel Moore
 Joe White
 Trevor Anderson
 Michael Hayles
 Flemming Wich

References

See also
 British Basketball League
 London Towers
 List of English National Basketball League seasons

Defunct basketball teams in the United Kingdom
Basketball teams in London
Former British Basketball League teams
Basketball teams established in 1966
Basketball teams disestablished in 1998
Crystal Palace, London
1966 establishments in England
1998 disestablishments in England